The Lutsao Refuse Incineration Plant is an incinerator in Lucao Township, Chiayi County, Taiwan.

History
The construction of the plant started on 1 September 1987 and completed on 30 November 1990. It began its commercial operation on 1 December 2001.

Architecture
The plant spans over an area of 4.5 hectares over a 10-hectare plot of land. Around 0.5 hectare of the land is used as a farm.

Technical details
The plant is managed by Onyx Ta-Ho Environmental Services Co., Ltd. It has a capacity of treating 900 tons of garbage per day from its two boilers. It also has a power generating unit with an installed capacity of 28 MW. As of 2020, it received a total of 26,070 tons of garbage annually and incinerated 25,420 tons of them.

See also
 Air pollution in Taiwan

References

2001 establishments in Taiwan
Buildings and structures in Chiayi County
Incinerators in Taiwan
Infrastructure completed in 1990